Patrick C. Larkins (February 14, 1860–November 25, 1918) was a Major League Baseball third baseman who played in 17 games for the Washington Nationals of the Union Association in . Prior to 2017, he was only identified as P. Larkin.

References

External links

1860 births
1918 deaths
Major League Baseball third basemen
19th-century baseball players
Washington Nationals (UA) players
Binghamton Bingoes players
Oswego Starchboxes players
Leavenworth Soldiers players
Canandaigua (minor league baseball) players